Harlem Village Academies (HVA) is a network of charter schools in Harlem, New York. Deborah Kenny is Chief Executive Officer.

Schools in the network include:
 Harlem Village Academy Charter School, grades 5–11, 244 W. 144th St., in Community School District 5; school chartered by State Univ. of N.Y. (SUNY)
 Harlem Village Academy Leadership Charter School, grades 5–8, 2351 1st Av., in Community School District 4; school's website; N.Y.C. Department of Education website for this school and statistics and reports; state test scores comparison;school chartered by State Univ. of N.Y. (SUNY). HVA Leadership Currently with about 290 students in grades 5 - 8 as of 2012.
HVA High serves 198 students in grades 9 - 12 as of 2012.
HVA Middle Currently with about 293 students in grades 5 - 8 as of 2012
HVA Elementary I
HVA Elementary II

References

Charter schools in New York City
Schools in Harlem
Public high schools in Manhattan